Point of Rocks is a historic plantation house located near Chester, Chesterfield County, Virginia.  It was built about 1840, and is a one-story, three-bay, double pile dwelling with weatherboard siding and a low-pitched hipped standing seam metal roof in the Greek Revival style. Also on the property is a contributing garage. The property was the location of a Union military observation point and headquarters for General Benjamin F. Butler and hospital established in 1864 during the Bermuda Hundred Campaign of the American Civil War.

It was listed on the National Register of Historic Places in 2005.

References

Plantation houses in Virginia
Houses on the National Register of Historic Places in Virginia
Greek Revival houses in Virginia
Houses completed in 1840
Houses in Chesterfield County, Virginia
National Register of Historic Places in Chesterfield County, Virginia